Ciruelos (plum tree in Spanish language) may refer to:

 Ciruelos, a Chilean village in the commune of Pichilemu;
 Ciruelos, a settlement in the Dominican Republic;
 Ciruelos, a town in the Spanish province of Segovia;
 Ciruelos, a location in the Spanish province of Toledo;
 Ciruelos River, in the province of Burgos, Spain